The first USC&GS Explorer was a steamer that served as a survey ship in the US Coast & Geodetic Survey (USCGS) from 1904-1939 with brief time 1918-1919 assigned to Navy for patrol in Alaskan waters. After initial service in the Atlantic the ship transferred to Seattle in 1907 to begin survey work in Alaskan waters during summer and more southern waters in winter. On return from the Navy the ship was condemned and due to be sold. Instead the ship was retained as a survey vessel into the fall of 1939 and existed into World War II when it saw service with the United States Army Corps of Engineers as Atkins.

Description as built
Explorer was built by Pusey & Jones of Wilmington, Delaware as hull number 316 and delivered to the Coast & Geodetic Survey on 30 November 1904.

Wood was the primary material with metal used only when needed and where it could be used "without defeating the purpose of the wooden hull".

Coast & Geodetic Survey service
The ship was placed in commission 29 December 1904 but was weather bound in Wilmington until 9 March 1905 at which time the ship sailed for Puerto Rico. Explorer made magnetic observations at Norfolk and during the remainder of the voyage. Work was then commenced on hydrographic surveys and updating Coast Pilot information. The ship returned to Baltimore, making magnetic observations during the voyage, on 21 June 1905 where repairs were made.

The ship left Baltimore 26 July 1905 reaching Rockland, Maine on 30 July to begin surveys lasting until 2 November when Explorer returned to Baltimore for repairs before sailing on 4 January 1906 for a winter survey season of the south coast of Puerto Rico arriving there on 20 January taking magnetic observations on the voyage. The southern surveys ended on 28 May with arrival at Baltimore on 5 June where repairs were undertaken. Explorer left Baltimore for northern surveys on 23 July 1906 working until the end of the season on 11 December and return to Baltimore on 15 December for repairs before a major transfer in operations. On 19 February 1907 the ship departed Baltimore for Seattle by way of the Straits of Magellan making magnetic observations during the voyage. On 3 July 1907 the ship reached San Diego and arrived in Seattle 15 July. On 17 August the ship sailed for Alaska to begin series of surveys in northern waters during summer and more southern portions of the west coast in winter. On 12 November 1907 her launch was run down by the steamer  in thick fog at Seattle, Washington. Two of four crewmen in the launch drowned in the incident.

Explorer was transferred to the US Navy on 22 May 1918 and commissioned as USS Explorer on 3 June 1918. The ship was assigned patrol the canneries and fishing grounds of Alaska, including Prince William Sound, until ordered to be returned to the Survey on 31 March 1919. The ship. along with USC&GS Patterson and Navy submarine chasers 309 and 310,  was assigned the patrol duty as a result of rumors of German and Industrial Workers of the World activity among the cannery and fishery workers. On return from the Navye Explorer was condemned and to be sold.

The USC&GS Director's annual report covering 1 July 1919 to 30 June 1920 contained an entire section dealing with the urgent need to survey Alaskan waters to enable commerce to develop in the territory. The shortage and limitations of vessels was emphasized. Explorer had been laid up in Seattle since its return from the Navy and was put back in commission for USC&GS work in February 1920. The ship was equipped for wire drag survey and as mother ship for smaller vessels and assigned  and Scandinavia which had both been repaired after their naval service. The vessels proceeded to Alaska for triangulation, topographic and hydrographic survey of Stephens Passage. Explorer continued in service and appears in the Coast and Geodetic Survey annual reports and the United States registry under "Vessels of the Coast and Geodetic Survey" into 1939.

Transfer to other agencies
Explorer, working in Puget Sound in the fall of 1939, was transferred to the National Youth Administration after service of thirty-five years as the new  was due to begin service in spring. Explorer was acquired and converted in 1941 by the US Army and renamed Atkins (FS 237) whereupon the United States Army Corps of Engineers used her for survey work.

Footnotes

See also

 USC&GS McArthur (1874)
 USC&GS Cosmos
 USC&GS Guide (1918)

References

External links 
 The steamer, Explorer, under construction. Possible launch day.
 "Through the Straits of Magellan on the Patterson"
 Navsource.com
 List of ships built by Pusey and Jones

Ships of the United States Coast and Geodetic Survey
Survey ships of the United States
Ships of the United States Army
Ships built by Pusey and Jones
1904 ships
National Youth Administration